Jose Daniel Martin Dockx (born 7 January 1974) is a Spanish Olympic dressage rider. Representing Spain, he competed at two Summer Olympics (in 2012 and 2016). He finished 7th in the team competitions at both of the Olympics. Meanwhile, his current best individual Olympic achievement is 29th place from 2012.

He also participated at the 2014 World Equestrian Games and at two European Dressage Championships (in 2013 and 2015). His current best championship result is 4th place in team dressage at the 2015 European Dressage Championships while his current best individual result is 18th place from 2014 Worlds.

References

External links
 
 

Living people
1974 births
Sportspeople from Málaga
Spanish male equestrians
Spanish dressage riders
Equestrians at the 2012 Summer Olympics
Equestrians at the 2016 Summer Olympics
Olympic equestrians of Spain